Mohamed Mahmoud Ibrahim (born 5 August 1937) is an Egyptian weightlifter. He competed at the 1960 Summer Olympics and the 1964 Summer Olympics.

References

1937 births
Living people
Egyptian male weightlifters
Olympic weightlifters of Egypt
Weightlifters at the 1960 Summer Olympics
Weightlifters at the 1964 Summer Olympics
People from Dakahlia Governorate
20th-century Egyptian people